Isa Smiler (born in Inukjuak, Nunavik in 1921, died at the same place in1986) was an Inuk artist from Nunavik.

His work is included in the collections of the Musée national des beaux-arts du Québec and the Penn Museum

References

1921 births
1986 deaths
20th-century Canadian artists
Inuit artists
Canadian male artists
People from Nunavik
Artists from Quebec
Inuit from Quebec
20th-century Canadian male artists